Nanacalathis is a genus of brachiopods belonging to the family Chlidonophoridae.

The species of this genus are found in Atlantic Ocean.

Species:

Nanacalathis atlantica 
Nanacalathis minuta

References

Terebratulida
Brachiopod genera